Baron Edmond de Mandat-Grancey (the good) (1842–1911), was a French journalist, writer and naval officer.

Life
After serving in the army, baron de Mandat-Grancey went on long travels. Starting in the 1880s he wrote a series of articles for the Correspondant on his trip into west Canada. He also published many works on his trip to Chicago, New York and Dakota in the United States of America, in which he put the French public on guard against what he saw as American "imperialism".

Mandat-Grancey also visited Madagascar, the French Congo and the Congo Free State (owned by king Leopold II of Belgium) as well as Greece and Ireland, writing memoirs of his trips there. At the turn of the century, the name of Mandat-Grancey would be associated with the royalism of Charles Maurras and the Action Française. He was one of the first contributors to the Revue d'Action française (founded by Henri Vaugeois and Maurice Pujo in 1899). He collected his articles in one volume as Le Clergé français et le Concordat (Paris, Perrin) in 1905.

Works 

 Dans les montagnes rocheuses (In the Rocky Mountains, 1884)
 En visite chez l'oncle Sam : New York et Chicago (Visiting Uncle Sam's home, 1885)
 Chez Paddy (In Paddy's home, 1887)
 La brèche aux buffles. Un ranch français dans le Dakota (Buffalo gap - a French ranch in Dakota, 1889)
 Chez John Bull, journal d'un rural (In John Bull's home - journal of a rural stay, 1895)
 Au Congo "1898". Impressions d'un touriste (In the Congo 1898 - a tourist's impressions, 1900)
 Au pays d'Homère (In the land of Homer, 1902)
 Souvenirs de la côte d'Afrique (Memoirs of the coast of Africa - Madagascar, Saint-Barnabé)

1842 births
1911 deaths
French travel writers
French Navy officers
French journalists
19th-century French people
French male non-fiction writers